In the 1976 Tour de France, the following 13 teams each sent 10 cyclists, for a total of 130:

Eddy Merckx, who already had won the Tour de France five times, had troubles to find his form in 1976, and suffered from saddle sores. He decided not to enter the 1976 Tour de France.
The main favourite for the victory was now Joop Zoetemelk, who had never finished worse than fifth place in the Tour de France.
The winner of the previous Tour, Bernard Thévenet, had a good spring season, winning the Dauphiné Libéré. The other former winner that was still racing, Luis Ocaña, had become second in the 1976 Vuelta a España, and was hoping to win again Also reigning world champion Hennie Kuiper was considered a pre-race favourite.

Start list

By team

By rider

By nationality

References

1976 Tour de France
1976